Alberto Johannes Först (November 26, 1926 – November 1, 2014) was a Catholic bishop.

Ordained to the priesthood on June 29, 1952, Först was named coadjutor bishop of the Diocese of Dourados, Brazil, on July 6, 1988, and was ordained bishop on September 7, 1988. He became diocesan bishop on May 12, 1990, and retired on December 5, 2001.

Notes

1926 births
2014 deaths
20th-century Roman Catholic bishops in Brazil
Roman Catholic bishops of Dourados